"Behind the Sun " is a song by German recording artist Alexander Klaws. Written and produced by frequent contributor Dieter Bohlen, it was released as the second single from Klaws's second album Here I Am (2004). A commercial success, it peaked at number two on the German Singles Chart and entered the top twenty in Austria and Switzerland, respectively.

Formats and track listings

Credits and personnel
Credits taken from Here I Am liner notes.

 Co-production — Jeo, Lalo Titenkov 
 Artwork — Ronald Reinsberg 
 Lyrics, music, production — Dieter Bohlen
 Mixing — Jeo

Charts

Weekly charts

Year-end charts

References

External links
  
 

2004 singles
2004 songs
Alexander Klaws songs
Songs written by Dieter Bohlen
Hansa Records singles